Hallein is a historic town in the Austrian state of Salzburg. It is the capital of Hallein district.

Geography

The town is located in the Tennengau region south of the City of Salzburg, stretching along the Salzach river in the shadow of the Untersberg massif, close to the border with Germany in the west. With a population of about 21,150, Hallein is the second largest town of the Salzburg state. The municipal area comprises the cadastral communities of Adnet II, Au, Burgfried, Dürrnberg, Gamp, Gries, Hallein proper, Oberalm II, and Taxach.

Hallein can be reached by suburban S-Bahn railway from the city of Salzburg. It has also access to the  A 10 Tauern Autobahn (European route E55) from Salzburg to Villach.

History
Long known for the Hallein Salt Mine in the Dürrnberg plateau, settling in the area have been traced 4000 years back. It was a Celtic community from 600 BCE until the Romans took over their Noricum kingdom in 15 BCE.

In the mid 8th century AD, Duke Tassilo III of Bavaria granted the estates to the Salzburg diocese; from 987 they were held by St Peter's Abbey. The extraction of salt became crucial for the economic wealth of the Archbishopric of Salzburg, competing with the salt production of Reichenhall in Bavaria. 

Salt mining at the site was first mentioned in an 1198 deed. The name Hallein is documented since the early 13th century; it is one of many Hall-names in the south German language area that may have something to do with salt and for which Celtic, Germanic and other origins have been discussed.

From the 15th century onwards, beer brewing became common in Hallein. In 1489 Prince-Archbishop Leonhard von Keutschach in 1489 acquired a large brewery, whereafter the sale of Hofbräu Kaltenhausen beers became another main source of revenue for the Salzburg archbishopric. At the end of the 17th century, Prince-Archbishop Kuenburg had the Protestant miners expelled, after which several hundred of them emigrated to Walcheren and Zeelandic Flanders in the Dutch Republic. With the former prince-archbishopric, Hallein became part of the Austrian Empire by 1816. The Kaltenhausen brewery was purchased by Archduchess Maria Leopoldine of Austria-Este and became one of the largest Salzburg operations during the 19th century.

In World War II, Hallein was the site of a work camp annex to the Dachau concentration camp. After the war, it was the site of a permanent Displaced Persons camp (Beth Israel). In mid-1947, ORT opened a school in two of the barracks, teaching tailoring, dressmaking, electrical and radio technology, baking, beautician training, and upholstery to over 200 students. Later ORT also offered English language classes. In 1948, with the closure of other DP camps, Hallein became the Austrian collection point for Jewish emigrees to Canada and the United States. The inmates even established a football team named Hakoah Hallein, coached by Heinrich Schönfeld. The camp closed in 1954.

Culture
 
Hallein hosts two museums of historic and musical interest. The Keltenmuseum displays artifacts and narrative describing the early Hallstatt and La Tene Celtic cultures as well as the development of salt mining in the region through the Middle Ages and Renaissance. The Silent Night Museum features information relating to the composing of one of the best-known Christmas songs of the 19th century. It documents the life and times of composer Franz Xaver Gruber. The museum houses the guitar originally used by lyricist Joseph Mohr and several signed copies of the sheet music.

Politics

Seats in the municipal assembly (Gemeinderat) as of 2019 elections:
Social Democratic Party of Austria (SPÖ): 9 
Austrian People's Party (ÖVP): 9 
Freedom Party of Austria (FPÖ): 3
The Greens: 3
NEOS – The New Austria and Liberal Forum: 1

Notable people
Clemens Holzmeister, architect, (1886-1983)
Herbert Fux, actor and politician, (1927-2007) 
Judith Wiesner, tennis player, born 1966 in Hallein
Johann Georg Mohr (to 1656 Radstadt - 1726 Hallein), Baroque sculptors, "Hall One Master"

 Franz Xaver Gruber (1787-1863), composer of Silent Night, Holy Night
 August Schenk (1815-1891), botanist
 Manfred Baumann (born 1956 Hallein), journalist, author, comedian and ORF editor
 Thomas Stangassinger (born 1965 Hallein), former skier
 Herbert Ilsanker (born 1967 Hallein), former football player
 Michael Wildner (born 1970 Hallein), former middle-distance runner
 Sanel Kuljić (born 1977 Salzburg), childhood in Hallein, football player
 Stefan Ilsanker (born 1989 Hallein), football player
 Marcel Hirscher (born 1989 in Hallein), former alpine skier
 Anna Veith (née Fenninger, born 1989 in Hallein), alpine ski racer

See also
 Dürrnberg
 Bavarian-Austrian Salt Treaty

References

External links

 Hallein official website

A timeline of Hallein salt mining can be found at http://www.salzwelten.at/en/hallein/saltmine/history/ 

 
Cities and towns in Hallein District